Stefanija  Michajłaŭna Staniuta (30 April 1905 – 6 November 2000) was a Belarus–Soviet theater and movie actress. People's Artist of the USSR (1988).

Stefanija was born on April 30, 1905 in Minsk in the family of the famous Belarusian artist Michaś Staniuta. As a child, she happened to attend the official meeting of Tsar Nicholas II with the Belarusian people.

She studied at the parish school, then at the Minsk Women's Government Gymnasium.  In 1926 she graduated from the Belarusan Drama Studio under the Moscow Art Theater (class of Valentin Smyshliayev and Sofia Giatsyntova).

Since 1932 and until the end of her life Stefanija Staniuta worked at the Janka Kupala National Academic Theatre in Minsk. In total she played about 200 roles, including in movies from 1958 onward.

Selected filmography 
 1958 – Red Leaves as episode
 1964 – Letters to the Living as episode
 1966 – I'm Going to Look For as episode
 1969 – I, Francysk Skaryna as Abbess
 1974 –  Adventures in a City that does not Exist as Aunt Polly
 1976 – The Troubled Month of Veresen as Serafima
 1977 – About the Little Red Riding Hood as 1st evil old woman
 1983 – Farewell as Darja
 1983 –  White Dew as Kisialikha
 1985 –  Mama, I'm Alive as Domna Fialipaŭna, a teacher in a partisan detachment
 1985 – Do Not Marry, Girls as Granny
 1991 – Tsar Ivan the Terrible as Anufrievna
 1995 – The Game of Imagination as Granny in a hat
 2001 – Holiday Romance  as episode

Awards and decorations
Her major awards and decorations include:
 People's Artist of the Byelorussian SSR (1957)
 People's Artist of the USSR (1988)
 Byelorussin SSR State Prize (1982) for theatrical performance
 Two Order of the Red Banner of Labour (1980, 1985)
 Order of Friendship of Peoples (1977)
 Order of the Badge of Honour (1955)
 Medal "For Distinguished Labour" (1955)
 Jubilee Medal "In Commemoration of the 100th Anniversary of the Birth of Vladimir Ilyich Lenin" (1969)
 Medal "For the Victory over Germany in the Great Patriotic War 1941–1945"
 Medal "For Valiant Labour in the Great Patriotic War 1941–1945"
 Medal "Veteran of Labour" (1975)
 Francysk Skaryna Medal (1995)
 Crystal Paulinka Prize (1992; thee first recipient) of Belarusian Union of Theater Workers

References

External links

 To remember: Stefaniya Staniyuta
   Urban dreams Queen Stefaniya 

1905 births
2000 deaths
Actors from Minsk
Belarusian film actresses
People's Artists of the USSR
Recipients of the Order of Friendship of Peoples
20th-century Belarusian actresses
Soviet film actresses